Giovanni Canauli or Giovanni Cannuli (1572 – 2 August 1619) was a Catholic prelate who served as Bishop of Fossombrone (1610–1612).

Biography
Giovanni Canauli was born in Città di Castello, Italy in 1572.
On 2 August 1610, he was appointed during the papacy of Pope Paul V as Bishop of Fossombrone.
On 22 August 1610, he was consecrated bishop by Michelangelo Tonti, Bishop of Cesena, with Ottavio Accoramboni, Bishop Emeritus of Fossombrone, and Metello Bichi, Bishop Emeritus of Sovana, serving as co-consecrators. 
He served as Bishop of Fossombrone until his resignation in 1612. 
He died on 2 August 1619.

Episcopal succession

References

External links and additional sources
 (for Chronology of Bishops) 
 (for Chronology of Bishops) 

17th-century Italian Roman Catholic bishops
Bishops appointed by Pope Paul V
1572 births
1619 deaths